The Netherlands national futsal team is the national team of the Netherlands. It is governed by the Royal Dutch Football Association (KNVB). The Netherlands organized the first FIFA Futsal World Championship in 1989 in Rotterdam, where they finished in second place after being beaten by Brazil 2–1 in the final.

Tournament records

FIFA Futsal World Cup

UEFA European Futsal Championship

Grand Prix de Futsal

Honours
 1989 FIFA Futsal World Championship:  2nd
 2006 Edegem 4 Nations Futsal Tournament:  1st

Players

Current squad
The following players were called up to the squad for the UEFA Futsal Euro 2022
Caps and goals are correct as of 16 January 2022.
Head coach: Maximiliaan Tjaden

References

External links
KNVB.nl – Official website of the KNVB 

Futsal
European national futsal teams
Futsal in the Netherlands